Henry George Liddell, 2nd Earl of Ravensworth (8 October 1821 – 22 July 1903), styled Lord Eslington between 1874 and 1878, was a British Conservative politician.

Background
Ravensworth was the son of Henry Liddell, 1st Earl of Ravensworth, and Isabella Horatia, daughter of Lord George Seymour.

Political career
Ravensworth sat in the House of Commons as one of two representatives for Northumberland South between 1852 and 1878. The latter year he succeeded his father in the earldom and entered the House of Lords.

Family
Lord Ravensworth married firstly Mary Diana, daughter of Orlando George Gunning-Sutton, on 8 December 1852 at Coolhurst, Sussex. They had two daughters. After her death in 1890, he married secondly Emma Sophia Georgiana, daughter of the Hon. Richard Denman and widow of Oswin Baker-Cresswell, in 1892. There were no children from this marriage. Lord Ravensworth died in July 1903, aged 81, and was succeeded in his titles by his younger brother, Atholl. Lady Ravensworth later remarried and died in January 1939.

References

External links 
 

1821 births
1903 deaths
Conservative Party (UK) MPs for English constituencies
Earls in the Peerage of the United Kingdom
UK MPs 1852–1857
UK MPs 1857–1859
UK MPs 1859–1865
UK MPs 1865–1868
UK MPs 1868–1874
UK MPs 1874–1880
UK MPs who inherited peerages
Barons Ravensworth